Sir Thomas Stuart Legg  (born 13 August 1935) is a British former senior civil servant, who was Permanent Secretary of the Lord Chancellor's Department and Clerk of the Crown in Chancery, United Kingdom (1989–98).

Biography
Born in London in 1935, Legg was educated at Horace Mann School in New York City, and Frensham Heights School in the UK. After National Service in the Royal Marines, under the military education system he read history and law at St John's College, Cambridge.

Career
Legg was called to the Bar in 1960, one of the 12 lawyers allocated to the Lord Chancellor's Department from 1962. He worked in the department for his entire career, which when he retired was responsible for administration of the UK legal system, and its co-ordination with European Union law, had resulted in the Department of Constitutional Affairs employing 20,00 staff and a budget of £2 billion. In 1989 he became permanent secretary and Clerk of the Crown in Chancery, until 1998. A Master of the Bench of the Inner Temple since 1984, he was made an honorary Queen's Counsel in 1990.

Inquiries
Since his retirement from the Civil Service in 1998, Legg has headed three key inquiries for the government. In 1998, then Cabinet Secretary Sir Robin Butler asked Legg and Sir Robin Ibbs to conduct an inquiry into allegations that British company Sandline International was trying to sell arms to the government in exile in Sierra Leone, contravening an international embargo. In what became known as the "arms to Sierra Leone" affair, the inquiry cleared the British Government of any underhand conspiracy with Sandline, prompting accusations of a whitewash.

In 2000 he carried out a parliamentary inquiry into the huge over-spend on Portcullis House, but his report was not published.

As a member of the Audit Commission, and member of the House of Commons Audit Committee, in 2009, in the wake of the United Kingdom Parliamentary expenses scandal, Legg was appointed to chair an independent panel with a remit to examine all claims relating to the second homes allowance between 2004 and 2008.

Other positions held
Since retirement, Legg has held: the chairmanship of the Imperial College Healthcare NHS Trust; served as chairman of the London Library; served as consultant to the law firm of Clifford Chance. After being co-opted onto the council of Brunel University in 1993, he was visitor from 2001 to 2006.

References

1935 births
Living people
20th-century Royal Marines personnel
Alumni of St John's College, Cambridge
Civil servants from London
British King's Counsel
Horace Mann School alumni
Knights Commander of the Order of the Bath
People associated with Brunel University London
People educated at Frensham Heights School
Permanent Secretaries to the Lord Chancellor's Office